The Extraordinary and Plenipotentiary Ambassador of Peru to Jamaica was the official representative of the Republic of Peru to Jamaica, resident in Kingston.

Peru maintained an embassy in Kingston until 2006. It had previously been closed in 1989 and reopened in 1995. The ambassador in Port of Spain is currently accredited to CARICOM, and thus, to Jamaica.

List of representatives

See also
List of ambassadors of Peru to Trinidad and Tobago

References

Jamaica
Peru